Pouteria pseudoracemosa is a species of plant in the family Sapotaceae. It is endemic to Tanzania.

References

Flora of Tanzania
pseudoracemosa
Vulnerable plants
Taxonomy articles created by Polbot
Northern Zanzibar–Inhambane coastal forest mosaic